The following is a timeline of the history of the city and metropolitan area of Manila, the capital city of the Philippines.

9th Century onward

 c. 900 CE - Kingdom of Tondo was at its peak and become a trade hub by the Tagalogs. and by this time, the King of Tondo issued the Laguna Copperplate Inscription to Namwaran's clan on 21 April 900 CE.
c. 1175 - the Polity of Namayan was established by the Tagalog people in the Pasig River and on its peak in 1100's led by the house of Lakan Tagkan.
 c. 13th Century-the kota Seludong or widely known as Maynila was founded by Avirjirkaya which is covers the present day Intramuros.
 c.1300- Empress Sasaban become the regent queen of Namayan, in oral tradition, she was a concubine of Anka Widyaya of Java and having child named Prince Balagtas 
 1365 - Battle of Manila (1365), Forces of the Kingdoms of Luzon battled the Empire of Majapahit from Java in what is now Manila.
 Uncertain - the Tagalog and Kapampangan fortified city of  Cainta  was established on a upriver which occupied both shores of an arm of the Pasig River. It was located not far from where the Pasig River meets the Lake of Ba-i.
 1450 - Kalangitan become the Hara of Tondo she reside in Pasig in the banks of the Bitukang Manok river (present day Parian creek). 
 1480 - Rajah Aki Matanda become the Rajah of Manila.
 1500 - Salalaia become the Rajah of old Manila.
 1521 -  Sri Bunao become the Lakandula based in Tondo.

16th Century
 May 24, 1570 - The battle of Manila between Rajah Sulayman and Martin de Goiti The battle concluded with the city being set on fire.
 1571 - 24 June: Spaniards Martín de Goiti, Juan de Salcedo and Miguel López de Legazpi arrive. and the same time. In August 1571, Legazpi assigned his nephew, Juan de Salcedo, to "pacify" Cainta. After travelling several days upriver, Salcedo lay siege to the city, and eventually found a weak spot on the wall. The final Spanish attack over 400 residents of Cainta killed including their leader Gat Maitan.
 1572 - The Spanish city was attacked and nearly captured by Chinese pirates.
 1573 - Spanish galleon trade begins.
 1574 - Chinese pirate Limahong tries to take Manila.
 1579 - Catholic Diocese of Manila established.
 1583 - Fire.
 1584 - Real Audiencia of Manila of the Viceroyalty of New Spain established.
 1590
 Printing press established.
 Construction of walls and other defences begins.
 1603 - Chinese unrest.
 1607 - San Agustin Church consecrated.
 1611 - University of Santo Tomas established by Catholic Dominicans.
 1615 - Acapulco-Manila galleon trade begins.
1620 -Colegio de San Juan de Letran established by Catholic Dominicans.
 1645 - 1645 Luzon earthquake.

18th -19th Century
 1762 - British occupation of Manila begins.
 1764 - British occupation of Manila ends per Treaty of Paris; Spanish in power again.
 1823 - Population: 38,000.
 1837 - Port opens to foreign trade.
 1848 - Diario de Manila newspaper begins publication.
 1852 - September: Earthquake.
 1859
 Escuela Municipal de Manila, the precursor of the Ateneo de Manila University founded.
 Ilustración Filipina magazine begins publication.
 1863 - 3 June: Earthquake.
 1865 - Manila Observatory founded.
 1866 - Canal de la Reina dug in Binondo.
 1870 - 23 March: Fire in Binondo.
 1876 - Population: 93,595.
 1880 - July: Earthquake.
 1881 - Hong Kong-Manila telegraph in operation.
 1882
 October: Typhoon.
 Water supply inaugurated.
 1887
 National Library of the Philippines founded.
 Population: 176,777.
 1888 - Commercial Association of Lumber established.
 1889 - Tabacalera Flor de la Isabela cigar factory built in Paco.
 1892 - Dagupan-Manila railway begins operating.
 1893
 Electrical lighting installed.
 Fire.
 1896 - 5 December: 1896 Manila mutiny.
  30 December: execution of Dr. Jose Rizal at Bagumbayan. 
 1898
 25 July - 13 August: Battle of Manila (1898); United States in power.
 The Manila Times English-language newspaper begins publication.
 1899
 4–5 February: Battle of Manila (1899).
 Taft Avenue ("Calle Rizal") laid out.

20th Century onward

 1900 - Instituto de Mujeres and American Circulating Library established.

20th century

1900s-1940s
 1901
 City of Manila administrative entity created, composed of Binondo, Ermita, Intramuros, Malate, Pandacan, Quiapo, Santa Cruz, Barrio San Nicolas, San Miguel, San Fernando de Dilao (Paco), Sampaloc, Tondo.
 Capital of the Philippines relocated to Manila from Malolos.
 Arsenio Cruz-Herrera becomes mayor.
 National Museum of the Philippines established.
 United States military Fort William McKinley established near city.
 The Philippine Constabulary was established and the general headquarters and military camp bases are located in the capital city.
 The Philippine Scouts was established and the general headquarters and military camp bases are located near the capital city.
 1902 - 
Manila's borders expanded to include Santa Ana de Sapa.
Manila Grand Opera House in use in Santa Cruz.
 1903 - Population: 219,928 city; 330,345 metro.
 1905
 Manila Elks Club established.
 Félix Roxas becomes mayor.
 1908
 University of the Philippines Manila founded.
 The famous Manila Carnival is held for the first time.
 1909 - Philippine Library established.
 1910
 Basketball, volleyball, and Boy Scouting are started in the Philippines at the Manila YMCA by YMCA Physical Director Elwood Stanley Brown.
 "Great Fire in Manila", costing over two million pesos, in Binondo.
 1911 - De La Salle College, known as De La Salle University founded.
 1912 - Manila Hotel in business.
 1913
 The first Far Eastern Championship Games, called "the first Oriental Olympic Games," are held at the Carnival grounds (later the site of the Rizal Memorial Sports Stadium) in Malate, 3–7 February, with participants from the US Philippine Islands, China, Japan, the British East Indies (Malaya), Thailand, and British Hong Kong.
 Rizal Monument erected.
 1917 - Justo Lukban becomes mayor.
 1918 - Population: 285,306 city; 469,955 metro.
 1919 - United States military Camp Nichols established near city.
 1920 - Ramón Fernández becomes mayor.
 1923 - The Peking Council, the Tokyo Council, and the Manila Council, the first Boy Scouts of America Councils in Asia, are organised.  (The huge 1973 Golden Jubilee Jamboree of the Boy Scouts of the Philippines would be dated from this year.)
 1924 - Miguel Romuáldez becomes mayor.
 1926 - Legislative Building inaugurated in Ermita.
 1927 - Tomás Earnshaw becomes mayor.
 1928 - The Institute of Accountancy, which later became Far Eastern University, is founded in Sampaloc by Nicanor Reyes et al.
 1930 - Legazpi-Urdaneta Monument erected.
 1935
 Metropolitan Theater built.
 Valeriano Fugoso becomes mayor.
 Grace Park Airfield begins operating in Caloocan.
 City becomes capital of the newly formed Commonwealth of the Philippines.
 The Philippine Commonwealth Army was established and the general headquarters and military camp bases are located in the capital city.
 1939 - Population: 623,492.
 1941
 City of Greater Manila formed, merging city and municipal governments of Manila, Quezon City, Caloocan, Makati, Mandaluyong, Parañaque, Pasay, and San Juan.
 Jorge B. Vargas becomes mayor.
 Manila City Hall was completed.
 Dissolution of the Philippine Commonwealth Army's general headquarters and camp base in the city's capital was until the occupied by the Japanese Imperial forces.
 1942
 Japanese occupation begins.
 León G. Guinto, Sr. becomes mayor.
 The general headquarters and military camp base of the Philippine Commonwealth Army was stationed are actively moved in the province.
 1945
 February: Manila massacre by Japanese forces.
 3 February - 3 March: Battle of Manila (1945); Japanese defeated.
 1 August: City of Greater Manila disestablished.
 Juan L. Nolasco becomes mayor.
 The re-established of the general headquarters and military camp base of the Philippine Commonwealth Army included Philippine Constabulary was turns back are station's re-active in the city's capital after liberation.
 1946 - City becomes part of the newly proclaimed Republic of the Philippines.
 1947 - Republic Theatre opens.
 1948
 Capital of the Philippines relocated from Manila to Quezon City.
 Manuel A. Roxas High School established in Paco.
 Manuel de la Fuente becomes mayor.
 Population: 983,906 city; 1,569,148 metro.
 Manila American Cemetery and Memorial established near city.
 1949 - 18 June: City legislative districts for House of Representatives of the Philippines expanded from two to four.

1950s-1990s
 1952
 Arsenio Lacson becomes mayor.
 National Press Club headquartered in city.
 1954 - Holy Child Catholic School active in Tondo.
 1959 - Ramon Magsaysay High School established in España, Manila.
 1960
 Araneta Coliseum opens in Quezon City.
 Population: 1,138,611 city; 2,462,288 metro.
 1961 - Manila Airport new terminal opens.
 1962 - Antonio Villegas becomes mayor.
 1966 - Cultural Center of the Philippines founded.
 1970
 Zone One Tondo Organization established.
 Population: 1,330,788 city; 3,966,685 metro.
 1971 - Ramon Bagatsing becomes mayor.
 21 August: Plaza Miranda Bombing.
 1973 - Some 3000 Boy Scouts camp out and conduct a massive clean-up of Intramuros, 9–11 February.
 1974 - Miss Universe 1974 pageant held.
 1975
 1 October: Thrilla in Manila.
 Metropolitan Manila Commission created to administer not just the city of Manila but also Caloocan, Mandaluyong, Makati, Malabon, Marikina, Muntinlupa, Navotas, Pasay, Pasig, Las Piñas, Parañaque, Pateros, Quezon City, San Juan, Taguig, and Valenzuela. 
 The Metro Manila Film Festival was first held.
 Population: 1,479,116 city; 4,880,006 metro.
 1976
 Capital of the Philippines relocated to Manila from Quezon City.
 Philippine International Convention Center built in Pasay.
 Ali Mall, the first shopping mall in the Philippines, opens in Quezon City.
 Harrison Plaza opens in Malate, Manila.
 1979 - Sampaloc flea market officially inaugurated.
 1980 - Population: 5,924,563 metro.
 1981
 Sister city relationship established with San Francisco, USA.
 Catholic pope visits city.
 1982 - Metro Manila Commission for Squatters established.
 1983 
 21 August: Assassination of Benigno Aquino, Jr. at Manila International Airport.
 31 August: Funeral procession of  Benigno Aquino, Jr passes by the capital from the Santo Domingo Church en route to Parañaque.
 1984
 Manila Light Rail Transit System Line 1 begins operating.
 Population: 1,728,441 city; 6,720,050 urban agglomeration (estimate).
 1985 - SM City North EDSA opens as the 1st SM Supermall.
 1986
 February: People Power Revolution.
 May: Mel Lopez becomes mayor.
 1987 
 First Coup Attempt
 City legislative districts for the House of Representatives expanded to the present six.
 1989 - Second Coup Attempt
 1987 - January: Mendiola Massacre.
 1992 - Alfredo Lim becomes mayor.
 1993 - the Easter Regatta, later called President´s Cup Regatta, was held for the first time in Manila Bay
 1994
 Museo Pambata opens in Ermita.
 20 May: Miss Universe 1994 pageant held.
 Population: 8,594,150 urban agglomeration (estimate).
 1995
 Metropolitan Manila Development Authority established.
 Catholic pope visits city.
 1996 - Ozone Disco fire
 1998 - Lito Atienza becomes mayor.
 1999 - Manila Metro Rail Transit System Line 3 begins operating.
 2000
 30 December: Rizal Day bombings.
 Green Papaya Art Projects founded.
 Population: 1,581,082 city; 9,932,560 metro.

21st century

 2001
 January: 2001 EDSA Revolution.
 April–May: EDSA III protest.
 2002 - Bus bombing.
 2003
 Army mutiny.
 Manila Light Rail Transit System Line 2 begins operating.
 2006 - May: Mall of Asia opens in Pasay.
 2007
 June: Alfredo Lim becomes mayor again.
 October: explosion in Glorietta
 November: Coup attempt.
 Asian Network of Major Cities 21 meets in Manila.
 MO_Space art gallery founded.
 2009 - September: Typhoon.
 2010
 23 August: Manila hostage crisis in Rizal Park.
 26 September: School bombing.
 Population: 1,652,171 city; 11,855,975 metro.
 2012 - August: Flooding.
 2013
 August: Million People March.
 Joseph Estrada becomes mayor.
 2015
 January: Catholic pope visits city.
 Population: 1,780,148.
 2016
22 May: Concert tragedy.
14 August: Tornado.
 2017 
30 January: Miss Universe 2016 pageant held.
June: Attack in Resorts World Manila.
 2018 - May: National Museum of Natural History opens in Ermita.
 2019
30 June: Isko Moreno becomes mayor of Manila.
 2022
30 June: Honey Lacuna becomes mayor of Manila. She is the first female to hold the position.

See also
 History of Manila
 Metro Manila
 List of mayors of Manila
 Other names of Manila
 List of historical markers in Manila
 Greater Manila Area
 Mega Manila
 Timeline of Philippine history
 List of cities by population density

References

Bibliography

Published in the 19th century

 
 

 
 
 
 
 

Published in the 20th century
 
 
 
 
 
 
 
 
 
 
 
 
 
 Edilberto De Jesus. 'Manila's first factories', Philippine Historical Review, 4 (1971)
 
 
 Daniel F. Doeppers. Manila, 1900-1941: Social change in a late colonial metropolis (New Haven: Yale University Southeast Asia Studies, 1984).
 
 
 
 Melinda Tria Kerkvliet, Manila workers' unions, 1900-1950 (Quezon City: New Day Publishers, 1992).
 
 
 
 Xavier Huetz de Lemps. 'Shifts in meaning of "Manila" in the nineteenth century', in Old ties and new solidarities: Studies on Philippine communities, ed. C. J.-H. Macdonald and G. M. Pesigan (Quezon City: Ateneo de Manila University Press, 2000)

Published in the 21st century

External links

Years in the Philippines
 
Manila
Manila-related lists
manila
Manila